{{DISPLAYTITLE:C10H13N5O3}}
The molecular formula C10H13N5O3 (molar mass: 251.246 g/mol, exact mass: 251.1018 u) may refer to:

 Cordycepin
 Deoxyadenosine

Molecular formulas